Alexander J. Bragg was born in Warrenton, North Carolina on June 14, 1815, and was buried in Camden, Alabama on December 11, 1877.  He married Nancy Arrington in 1839 in Sumter County, Alabama and he was married a second time in 1848 with Martha Nunnellee. He was brother the Confederate general Braxton Bragg, a brother of Mobile, Alabama Congressional politician, John Bragg (politician), and a brother Thomas Bragg, a governor of North Carolina for 1855 to 1859 and United States Senator for 1859 to 1861. With the first wife he had a son.  With the second wife had seven children.

He was architect.  His works included the Camden, Alabama courthouse (Wilcox County Courthouse Historic District), William King Beck House in Wilcox County, Alabama, and Bragg-Mitchell Mansion in Mobile, Alabama.

References

1815 births
1877 deaths